Zabrus deflexicollis is a species of ground beetle in the Polysitus subgenus that is endemic to Morocco.

References

Beetles described in 1880
Beetles of North Africa
Endemic fauna of Morocco
Zabrus